"WXIN" (90.7 FM) is the student campus radio broadcast service of Rhode Island College. It operates a part 15 FM transmitter on the property of Rhode Island College, in Providence, Rhode Island, United States. In addition, "WXIN" rebroadcasts its programming in the form of a webcast over the Internet through streaming service providers Live365, Ustream, and Streamyard. The webcast is also picked up and played over speakers at various locations throughout the campus. The station also does podcasting through the name "NIXM" and can be found on Spotify and Soundcloud.

Organization and history

WXIN is a student organization, officially recognized by Rhode Island College, and funded by Student Community Government, Inc. The organization has been broadcasting as Rhode Island College's sole radio station consistently since 1979. The station began as a carrier-current station on campus, operating as "WRIC" on 580 AM, and began broadcasting on 88.1 FM and later 90.7 FM in the late 1980s. The student-run organization was named "Organization of the Year" at RIC for a third time in 2011, and received the honor again for a fourth time in 2013. In October 2015, WXIN was awarded as the "Biggest Champion of the Local Scene" at the College Radio Awards hosted by the College Music Journal.

References

External links
 WXIN official website

XIN (FM)
Unlicensed radio stations in the United States
XIN (FM)